The Battle of Chakirmaut, also known as the Battle of the Thirteen Sides, was the concluding battle of Genghis Khan's unification of the Mongol tribes. Temujin fought and defeated the combined forces of coalition of tribes led by the Naimans under Tayang Khan and his son Kuchlug and rival Khan claimant Jamukha. Tayang Khan died in battle, Kuchlug fled with a small force and Jamukha retreated but was later captured and executed.

References

Sources

External links
 Battle of Chakirmaut 1204
 The Battle of Chakirmaut: Genghis Khan Conquers Mongolia

 

Chakirmaut
Genghis Khan
Chakirmaut
1200s in the Mongol Empire